Neuenkirchen can refer to several municipalities in Germany:

in Lower Saxony:
Neuenkirchen, Cuxhaven, part of the Samtgemeinde Hadeln, district of Cuxhaven
Neuenkirchen, Diepholz, part of the Samtgemeinde Schwaförden, district of Diepholz
Neuenkirchen, Osnabrück, district of Osnabrück
Neuenkirchen (Samtgemeinde), a collective municipality in Osnabrück
Neuenkirchen (Lüneburg Heath), Soltau-Fallingbostel district
Neuenkirchen, Stade, part of the Samtgemeinde Lühe, district of Stade
Neuenkirchen-Vörden, district of Vechta
in Mecklenburg-Vorpommern:
Neuenkirchen, Anklam-Land, part of the Amt Anklam-Land, Vorpommern-Greifswald district
Neuenkirchen, Landhagen, part of the Amt Landhagen, Vorpommern-Greifswald district
Neuenkirchen, Mecklenburg-Strelitz, part of the Amt Neverin, Mecklenburg-Strelitz district
Neuenkirchen, Rügen, part of the Amt West-Rügen, Rügen district
in North Rhine-Westphalia:
Neuenkirchen, Westphalia, district of Steinfurt
Neuenkirchen, part of the town Rietberg, district of Gütersloh
in Schleswig-Holstein:
Neuenkirchen, Schleswig-Holstein, part of the Amt Weddingstedt, Dithmarschen district

See also
Neunkirchen (disambiguation)
Neukirchen (disambiguation)
Neukirch (disambiguation)
Neunkirch